Tartak is a popular hip-hop/rapcore/alternative crossover band from Ukraine. They mix styles of guitar rock, hip-hop and dance music to produce an energetic compositions and lyrics.

Sashko thought that a woodsaw symbolized something energetic, loud, active, and was hence appropriate for a band name.

History
Sashko Polozhynskyi and Vasily Zinkevich, Jr. founded the group in the Fall of 1996 in Lutsk, Ukraine. The name of the group, Tartak, means a woodworking company.

The group has released five albums with a total of 74 songs and 9 videos.  Tartak's songs "Ni Ya Ne Tu Kokhav" and "Stilnykove Kohannia" stayed on the Top 40 charts for 144 days and 75 days respectively.  Tartak was one of the bands that performed during the events of the Orange Revolution.

On Independence Day of Ukraine 2020 President Volodymyr Zelensky awarded Polozhynskyi the Order of Merit, but Polozhynskyi renounced it and stated that the award should have been given to the five War in Donbass veterans were that were arrested in December 2019 on the suspicion of killing journalist Pavel Sheremet. According to Polozhynskyi there was no "really substantial proof of their guilt" and they had been "suffering from lawlessness for more than six months." He blamed Zelensky for his "participation a briefing where people were unjustifiably called murderers - without trial, without investigation, without evidence."

Beginning and First Album (1996-2001) 
The point of reference for the history of the Tartak band is 1996. It was then that the newly formed band took part in the selection round of the Chervona Ruta festival, at which Tartak soon won. Tartak won the first prize in the dance music genre.

At the end of 1997, Sashko Polozhynsky and Vasily Zinkevich, Jr., who formed the band at the time, were joined by Andrii Blahun - keyboardist - and guitarist Andrii "Muha" Samoilo. At the beginning of 1998, as a part of the band, musicians traveled all over Ukraine as the winners of the Chervona Ruta-97 festival (chervona means red and ruta is a mythological or actual species of flowering plants). 

At the end of the tour, Tartak experienced a number of setbacks. Initially, it was forbidden to give concerts at open venues in Kyiv, then Vasyl Zinkevich Jr. was forced to leave the collective. The band balanced in the air for a long time until they were taken into care by producer Olexii Yakovliev. During this time, Sashko Polozhynskyi had time to work on radio and television, which made Tartak, in the person of the frontman, more recognizable. 

At the end of 1999, DJ Valentyn Matiyuk joined the band, and at the beginning of 2000, Tartak sat down to record its debut album, Demo hrafichnyi vybukh (Demo Graphic Blast) which has been recorded for almost two years. 

For the five songs that were included in the album, they made video clips. The first video-clip for the song "O-la-la" was shot by Viktor Prykhodko back in 1999. In October 2001, drummer Eduard Kosorapov and bass player Dmytro Chuyev joined the band. The joining of new musicians made it possible to move to full live sound at concerts - without backings and sequences. 

One by one Tartak was invited by all the largest Ukrainian festivals: - "Tavriysky Ihry", "Pearls of the Season", "Lemkivska Vatra" in Poland, "Extremism" in Kyiv, "Rokoteka" in Lviv, "Tchaika", where for the first time acted as the headliner, and already at the height of this festival procession was a performance on "Rock Existence".

System of Nerves and MuLyShcha (2002-2005) 
In the middle of 2002, Tartak began recording a second album. The idea of creating a collection of songs recorded with friends, Sashko has long been nurtured. And in March 2003, the newly released album of duets System of Nerves appeared. The album included 17 songs, which included, among others, "Katya Chilly," "TNMK," "DE SHIFER," "Faktychno Sami," "Motor'roll," "Svityaz" and others. Tartak spent the entire first half of 2004 in the studio, and as a result, the third album, Music Letter of Happiness, was released in June. The album included 15 songs, among which the songs "Veselo!", "Nashelito", "Hooligany", "I ne khochu" and "Stilʹnykove Kokhannya" became particularly popular.

Opir materialiv and Simka (2009—2014) 
The new album, Opir materialiv (Material Resistance) was uploaded for free on New Year's Day, January 1, 2010. The reason was the unsuccessful negotiations for the release of the disc.

2012 saw the release of the next album, Simka, which included 12 tracks.

In 2014, Polozhynskyi took up the Buv'ye side-project with which he recorded an album and several singles.  On April 15, 2019, Buv'ye celebrated its fifth anniversary and presented its second studio album. On the occasion of the anniversary, the team had prepared a gift for all its fans - the release of the second album entitled 12 Pisenʹ, Yakymy BUV'YE Ne Khoche Nikomu Nichoho Dovodyty (12 Songs that BUVIE Wants No One to Prove Anything).

Discography

Studio albums
 2001 - Demo hrafichnyi vybukh (Демографічний вибух)
 2003 - Systema nerviv (Система нервів)
 2004 - Muzychnyi lyst shchastia (Музичний лист щастя)
 2005 - Huliai-Horod (Гуляйгород)
 2006 - Slozy ta sopli (Сльози та соплі)
 2010 - Opir materialiv (Опір матеріалів)
 2012 - Simka (Сімка)
 2015 - Vvichnist (Ввічність)

Remix albums
 2005 - Pershyi komertsiynyi (Перший комерційний))
 2007 - Kofein (Кофеїн)
 2010 - Nazbyralosia na 2010 (Назбиралося на 2010) - remixes, remakes, unreleased

Singles
 2006 - "Ukrayino, zabyvai!" (Україно, забивай!)

Compilations
 2006 - Zaklipani pisni abo bachyly ochi shcho kupuvaly (Закліпані пісні або бачили очі що купували)
 2007 - Dlia tiekh kto v puti (Для тєх кто в путі)

References

Inline

External links

  Official web site
  Official biography by band's front-man Sashko Polozhynskyi
  10th Anniversary interview

Ukrainian rock music groups